Lake Tekapo Airport  is a Non-Certificated Airport  west of Lake Tekapo township in the Mackenzie District of the South Island in New Zealand. The airport was constructed by Air Safaris in 1974 for scenic charter flights over the Southern Alps.

Operational information
Movements restricted to paved areas.
Non-standard RWY markings for Air Safaris reference and use only.
CAUTION: Main highway on approach to RWY 11. Maintain adequate clearance.
CAUTION: Tekapo/Mackenzie heliport located 1.5NM to SW of aerodrome.
VFR operations within NZB978 Southern Alps MBZ are subject to special procedures.
Refer to ENR 1.16 VFR Procedures, Mount Cook/Westland.
LED emergency lighting available — full length. VFR night operations limited to Air Safaris
approved pilots.
Fuel: Greenstone Energy Swipecard AVGAS, Jet A1

Gallery

Sources 
NZAIP Volume 4 AD
AIP New Zealand  (PDF)

Transport in Canterbury, New Zealand
Airports in New Zealand
Transport buildings and structures in Canterbury, New Zealand